The fifth election to the Powys County Council since local government reorganization in Wales in 1995 was held on 4 May 2017, along with other local government elections. It was preceded by the 2012 election and will be followed by the 2022 election.

Results overview

 

|}

Sixteen seats were uncontested and, in another seat, Yscir, no one initially stood at all for the seat (the only ward in Wales where this happened). Nine Independent seats, out of the thirty won, were due to only one candidate standing for election. Five of the seven Labour seats and one each of the Conservative and Liberal Democrat seats were also uncontested.

Ward results (Brecknockshire)

Aber-craf

Bronllys

Builth

Bwlch

Crickhowell

Cwmtwrch

Felinfach

Gwernyfed

Hay
The sitting member had previously stood as a Conservative. His change is shown from when he stood as a Conservative in 2012.

Llanafanfawr

Llangattock

Llangors

Llangynidr

Llanwrtyd Wells

Maescar / Llywel

St David Within

St John

St Mary

Talgarth

Talybont-on-Usk

Tawe Uchaf

Ynyscedwyn

Yscir
No nominations received.

The postponed poll took place on 22 June 2017 and was won by the Conservative Iain McIntosh.

Ystradgynlais

* = sitting councillor prior to the election

Ward results (Montgomeryshire)

Banwy

Berriew

Blaen Hafren

Caersws

Churchstoke

Dolforwyn

Forden

Glantwymyn

Guilsfield

Kerry

Llanbrynmair

Llandinam

Llandrinio

Llandysilio

Llanfair Caereinion

Llanfihangel

Llanfyllin

Llanidloes
The sitting member had previously stood as an independent. His change is shown from his performance as an Independent in 2012.

Llanrhaeadr-ym-Mochnant/Llansilin

Llansantffraid

Llanwddyn

Machynlleth

Meifod

Montgomery

Newtown Llanllwchaiarn North

Newtown Llanllwchaiarn West

Newtown Central

Newtown East
The sitting member had previously stood as a Liberal Democrat. Her change is shown from her performance as a Liberal Democrat in 2012.

Newtown South

Rhiwcynon

Trewern

Welshpool Castle

Welshpool Gungrog

Welshpool Llanerchyddol

* = sitting councillor prior to the election

Ward results (Radnorshire)

Beguildy

Disserth and Trecoed

Glasbury

Knighton
The sitting member had previously stood as an independent. His changes are shown from his performance as an independent in 2012.

Llanbadarn Fawr

Llandrindod East/West

Llandrindod North
The sitting member had previously stood as an independent. His changes are shown from when he stood as an independent in 2012.

Llandrindod South

Llanelwedd

Llangunllo

Llanyre

Nantmel

Old Radnor

Presteigne
The sitting member had previously stood as a Liberal Democrat, but was elected as an independent in 2012.

Rhayader

* = sitting councillor prior to the election

By-elections

Llandrindod North

Newtown South

St Mary

See also
 List of electoral wards in Powys

Sources

References

2017
2017 Welsh local elections